Vlaams Belang (VB) is a  Flemish nationalist, anti immigration, right-wing populist political party in the Flemish Region and Brussels Capital Region of Belgium.

Vlaams Belang is a rebrand of Vlaams Blok, which dissolved after a trial in 2004 condemned the party for racism. After reorganizing itself as Vlaams Belang, the party continued the core philosophy of its predecessor by campaigning on a separatist and Flemish nationalist platform. It also supports maintaining Flemish cultural identity, opposition to multiculturalism and calls for tougher law and order policies. However, the VB toned down and implemented some changes to the more controversial portions of the former Vlaams Blok statute and has sought to change its image from a radical to a more conservative party by distancing itself from some of its former programs. Nonetheless, most other parties initially continued the cordon sanitaire which was implemented against the former party, effectively blocking the Vlaams Belang from taking part in government at any level. Additionally, attempts on cutting public subsidies specifically for the party were made through the Belgian draining law.

Like Vlaams Blok, Vlaams Belang was initially popular with the Flemish electorate and was one of the most successful national-populist parties in Europe. However, from 2008 the party experienced a downturn in support and membership which coincided with internal disputes within the party and the rise of the more moderate nationalist New Flemish Alliance which also supports Flemish independence. Under the current leadership of Tom Van Grieken, the VB has begun to regain popular support and made a comeback during the 2019 federal elections. Following the election, there has been some media speculation that the cordon sanitaire on the party may be lifted for the first time.

History

Background, Vlaams Blok

The direct predecessor of the Vlaams Belang was the Vlaams Blok, which was formed by the nationalist right-wing and national conservative faction of the People's Union (VU) which had emerged in the late 1970s. The ideology of the Vlaams Blok started out with its radical nationalist rejection of the People's Union compromise on the Flemish autonomy issue, and later increasingly focused on immigration and security, exploitation of political scandals, and defense of traditional values. The immigration positions of the Vlaams Blok were subject to much controversy, particularly after the party released its 70-point plan, and the Vlaams Blok was forced to disband in 2004 after a political trial ruled that it sanctioned discrimination. By then, the party was the most popular Flemish party, supported by about one in four of the Flemish electorate, and was one of the most successful parties considered to be right-wing populist in Europe as a whole.

In Belgium in 2001, Roeland Raes, the ideologue and vice-president of Vlaams Blok, gave an interview on Dutch TV where he cast doubt over the number of Jews murdered by the Nazis during the Holocaust. In the same interview he questioned the scale of the Nazis' use of gas chambers and the authenticity of Anne Frank's diary. In response to the media assault following the interview, Raes was forced to resign his position but vowed to remain active within the party.

Upon complaints filed by the governmental Centre for Equal Opportunities and Opposition to Racism and the Dutch-speaking Human Rights League in Belgium, in 2001 three non-profit organisations that in effect constituted the core of the Vlaams Blok party were charged with violation of the Law on Racism and xenophobia by assisting "a group or organisation that clearly and repeatedly commits discrimitation or segregation," here the political party. By April 2004, the Appellate Court of Ghent came to a final verdict, forbidding their and the party's continued existence for its "repeated incitement to discrimination." In November that year, the Court of Cassation rejected their last appeal to annul the verdict; the delay had allowed using the name Vlaams Blok for election candidacy.

Vlaams Belang (2004–2008)
After the Supreme Court ruling, the leadership of the VB seized the occasion to dissolve itself, and start afresh under a new name. On 14 November, the Vlaams Blok thus disbanded itself, and the Vlaams Belang was established. Other proposed names had included the Flemish People's Party and Flemish Freedom Front. The Vlaams Belang instituted a number of changes in its political program, carefully moderating or discarding some of the more radical positions of the former Vlaams Blok. Nevertheless, the party leader Frank Vanhecke made it clear that the party would fundamentally remain the same; "We change our name, but not our tricks. We change our name, but not our programme."

Former Vlaams Blok chairman Frank Vanhecke was chosen as chairman of the Vlaams Belang on 12 December 2004. Like its predecessor, the Vlaams Belang has continued to be subjected to the cordon sanitaire, wherein all the traditional Flemish parties have agreed to systematically exclude the party, and never form a coalition with it. This situation was however altered slightly with the emergence of the smaller right-wing party List Dedecker (founded in 2007), which has not joined in on the agreement. In an interview with the popular weekly Humo, Flemish Prime Minister Yves Leterme for instance declared that a local chapter of his Christian Democratic and Flemish party (CD&V) that would form a coalition or close agreements with the Vlaams Belang, would no longer be considered part of the CD&V.

The VB contested the 2006 municipal elections on the theme of "Secure, Flemish, Liveable". The VB enjoyed a massive increase of votes, and its council members almost doubled, from 439 to about 800. The election result was described by the party as a "landslide victory." In Antwerp, the VB's vote count ran behind that of the Socialist Party, which increased their share of the vote dramatically. Nevertheless, the VB, which was in a coalition with the minor VLOTT party, slightly increased their vote in the city to 33.5%. In the 2007 general election, the party won 17 seats in the Chamber of Representatives and five seats in the Senate, remaining more or less at status quo. Earlier the same year, the party joined the short-lived European Parliament group Identity, Tradition and Sovereignty alongside parties such as the French National Front.

Decline in support and internal strife (2008–2018)
In 2008, Bruno Valkeniers was chosen as new party chairman for the VB, having contested the position unopposed. In 2009, the party contested elections for the Flemish Parliament and the European Parliament. The party was reduced from 32 to 21 seats (from the Vlaams Blok's record 24%, to 15%) in the Flemish parliament, and from three to two seats in the European parliament. In the 2010 general election, the party was again reduced, to 12 seats in the Chamber, and three in the Senate. This was largely due to the great success of the more moderate new party New Flemish Alliance, which also campaigned on Flemish independence and took many of the VB's votes. Around this time, the VB also saw several high-profile members defect from or quit the party, such as former leader Frank Vanhecke. After the party suffered heavy losses during the local elections of 2012 Bruno Valkeniers stepped down as party chairman and was succeeded by Gerolf Annemans.

In the 2014 federal and regional elections the party again suffered a big loss and was reduced to 5.9% of the Flemish vote. The European list, pulled by Annemans, scored slightly better with 6.8%. Annemans resigned as party leader, a function he only performed for two years, and argued for a rejuvenation of the party. The following party chairman election was won by the only candidate, Tom Van Grieken, then 28 years old and at the time the youngest leader of a political party in Belgium. After assuming leadership of the party, Van Grieken sought to soften and moderate its image further.

Resurgence (2018–present)
During the 2018 Belgian local elections the party saw a resurgence in support, obtaining 13.1% of the Flemish vote with an outlier of more than 40% in the city of Ninove where it fought locally under the name of Forza Ninove. The party also led a campaign against the Global Compact for Migration, which some commentators credit to successfully pressuring the rival N-VA to adopt a position against the Compact.

On May 26, 2019, in what was known as "Super Sunday" in Belgium (owing to the fact the Federal, Regional and European elections took place on the same day) the party made substantial gains in all three elections which some political analysts described as a significant comeback.

The party polled second place in the Flemish region with 18.6% of the overall vote, increasing its number of MPs in the Chamber of Representatives to 18 (its best result since 2007).  In the Flemish Parliament the party also finished second, gaining 23 representatives. The party's campaign was managed by Bart Claes. Political analysts noted that the VB saw an increase in support among voters under 30 which was attributed to the party's use of social media campaigning.

In response to the results there was some speculation that the N-VA leader Bart De Wever would break the Cordon sanitaire imposed on the party after he decided to hold talks with the VB as part of the coalition formation on the Flemish level,  as their strong results made forming a coalition without them more difficult. The ending of the Cordon Sanitaire was further speculated after the VB leader Tom Van Grieken was invited to a customary meeting with King Philippe for the first time along with the leaders of the other main parties. The former Vlaams Blok party had previously been denied a meeting with the King in 1991 and 2003. Eventually though, the party remained in opposition both at the regional and federal level, as, with the exception of N-VA, no other party was found willing to break the cordon.

Ideology
The policies of the Vlaams Belang focus mainly on the issues of Flemish independence, opposition to multiculturalism, and defence of traditional Western values.

Flemish nationalism
The VB's main goal is to establish an independent Flemish republic. The party seeks a peaceful secession of Flanders from Belgium, citing in its program the dissolution of the Union between Sweden and Norway (1905), Czechoslovakia (1992), and the independence of Montenegro (2006) as examples that such would be possible. The reason to seek independence is given as the "enormous cultural and political differences between Flemings and Walloons," and according to the party, Belgian governments are also "paralyzed by ongoing disputes between Flemish and Walloon politicians." Other stated reasons given for secessionism are the financial transfers from Flanders to the capital of Brussels and to Wallonia (Belgium's other half), which Vlaams Belang considers to be unjustified. Members of Vlaams Belang argue that the French speaking Socialist Party de facto rules Belgium and does not represent the interests of Flemish voters. The party also calls for the exclusive use of the Dutch language in Flanders and for compulsory measures that both immigrants and Francophone residents of Flanders learn to speak Dutch. In contrast to its Vlaams Blok predecessor, the VB has downplayed and placed less emphasis on ethnonationalism in recent years when discussing Flemish national identity. Political author Hans-Georg Betz noted that the party no longer features the ethnically defined version of people (“volk”) that was featured in the former Vlaams Blok "Own People First" slogan and instead uses the neutral sounding Mensen — the Dutch word for human beings in its messages.

Domestic policies
The Vlaams Belang supports returning Brussels to the full control of Flemish region as opposed to its current state as a bilingual capital region. It also wants Dutch to be the sole official language of Flanders. The party also favours abolishing the Belgian Senate.

Although the party almost exclusively stands in the Flemish region of Belgium, it ran a list of candidates in the Walloon Brabant electoral district in 2007 as a protest against the lack of splitting between Flemish and Francophone communities in Brussels-Halle-Vilvoorde.

Immigration and minorities
The Vlaams Belang official immigration policy has been slightly moderated from that of the former Vlaams Blok. In its new program, the party simply call for the repatriation of those immigrants who "reject, deny or combat" Flemish culture as well as certain European values, including freedom of expression and equality between men and women. Prominent members of the party, under which Filip Dewinter and Dries Van Langenhove, furthermore tap into the Great Replacement-theory, using the term omvolking (replacing-populating).

The former Vlaams Blok was, according to political scientist Cas Mudde, only very rarely accused of anti-Semitism – and even then, it was strongly condemned by the party leadership. Accused of being anti-Muslim, the party favors the expulsion of all who opposed Western values and after the March, 2016 terrorist attacks in Brussels, called for closed borders. The party is also opposed to what it regards as lenient immigration policies and state multiculturalism forced on the Flemish region by the Belgian federal government and the European Union, arguing that such policies leave Flanders vulnerable to terrorism and have eroded Flemish culture. It is also states that immigrants must adapt to Flemish values and culture rather than Flanders having to change to adopt the cultures of migrants, and that immigrants who cannot adapt to Flemish culture or laws should be offered incentives to voluntarily repatriate themselves. The party also supports the expulsion of illegal immigrants and foreign residents with criminal records from Flanders.

Currently the party sees itself as strongly pro-Israel, regarding Jews and Israelis as allies against radical Islam. Filip Dewinter, for example, has stated that women wearing the hijab have "effectively signed their contract for deportation." In Antwerp, sections of the city's large Jewish community actively support the party, as they feel threatened by the new wave of anti-Semitism from the growing Muslim population. In 2010, the party was part of a delegation to Israel (along with some other rightist parties), where they issued the "Jerusalem Declaration," which defended the right of Israel to exist and defend itself against terrorism. Israeli Deputy Minister Ayoob Kara in turn visited the party in Antwerp in 2011. In March 2014, a party mission headed by Dewinter visited Israel and met with Deputy Minister in the Prime Minister's Office Ofir Akunis. and Samaria Regional Council, Gershon Mesika and Yossi Dagan.

Social issues
Like its Vlaams Blok predecessor, the Vlaams Belang was initially opposed to same-sex marriage and instead advocated civil partnerships for same-sex couples. After assuming leadership, Tom Van Grieken stated that the party had dropped its opposition to gay marriage. In 2014, the party moderated its stance and changed its policy to support same-sex marriage. This more moderate stance has not been widely accepted by all party members. On abortion the party is socially conservative.

Law and order
In order to secure Flemish cities, the party wants to implement a policy of zero tolerance. It supports the abolition of the Belgian parole law, which allows convicts to be released after only one third of their prison sentence has been served. The party also opposes drug liberalization. Citing "a massive overrepresentation of immigrants in crime statistics," the party also wants to deport criminal and illegal foreigners, as well as seeking to "combat Islamic terror threat."

Foreign policy
The party describes itself as pro-European in terms of protecting European culture and cooperation between nations to secure peace, but takes a strict eurosceptic stance towards the European Union as a whole and argues the EU does not financially benefit Flanders or respect the national identity of member states. In its program, the VB is strongly against any evolution towards a Federal European Superstate, argues for Flemish withdrawal from the Schengen Area and the reinstatement of border controls, abolition of the Eurozone and opposes the accession of Turkey to the European Union. The party states that it supports cooperation of European nations for economic trade and to give Flanders political visibility but calls for the EU to be fundamentally changed into a smaller confederal union of independent nations or abolished if it becomes a Federal Superstate and imposes further open border policies on Flanders.

Economy
The party's economic policy has been changed significantly from the Vlaams Blok. While the Vlaams Blok called for a rather mixed economy, the Vlaams Belang moved towards neoliberalism. However, for the 2019 federal election, the party returned to a protectionist economic program.

Reception and criticism
Like its predecessor, Vlaams Belang has been accused of racism and for promoting hostility and xenophobia by both French and Dutch speaking political opponents in Belgium. Since its founding, most parties in Belgium have refused to cooperate with the VB and in 2004 continued the  cordon sanitaire on the party in the Federal Parliament. The party itself has repeatedly denied that it is racist and believes such accusations are based on attempts to discredit the party. Politicians, like prime former Belgian minister Guy Verhofstadt (VLD) and Karel De Gucht (VLD) have called the Vlaams Belang or its leaders "fascist". However, history professor Eric Defoort has stated the use of this terminology creates "a distorted image of their antagonist, whom they can then scold with missionary zeal." Prominent conservative philosopher Sir Roger Scruton argued that while Vlaams Belang contains policies that could be determined as disagreeable, it is not a racialist or fascistic movement and compared to other right-wing European parties, it is unduly attacked and marginalized by members of the political establishment who have sought to destroy the party through legal battles as the VB's aims threaten vested the interests of the European Union which is centered in Belgium.

Ayaan Hirsi Ali, a prominent critic of Islam in the Netherlands, and to whom Vlaams Belang on different occasions referred to defend its points of view on Islam, called the party "a racist, anti-Semitic, extremist party that is unkind to women and that should be outlawed." The party responded that Ali had been misinformed and considered this to be part of a smear campaign. Vlaams Belang underlined that Ali supposedly made the statement on the occasion of a debate organised by the left-liberal think tank Liberales, whose president is Dirk Verhofstadt who is known for regularly publishing accusations against the party. Vlaams Belang also wrote an open letter to Ali supporting her work. In 2011, all the French speaking Belgian parties in the Federal parliament, as well as the Flemish Groen! and sp.a, called on the Belgian Council of State to withdraw all allocation of parliamentary money to the party, claiming statements and policies proposed by its leadership violated the European Convention on Human Rights (ECHR). However, the Council of State rejected the calls, arguing that the party had not violated the rules of the ECHR and that other accusations made against the party were based on old evidence revolving around the former Vlaams Blok trial. The VB's leadership described the accusations against the party as politically motivated and undemocratic. 

Although collaboration with the party still remains controversial within some political circles, more mainstream Belgian politicians have started to discuss the possibility of including the party in coalition talks and lifting the cordon sanitaire, arguing that the VB's gradual moderation and growth in support cannot be ignored and that some of the policies the party has campaigned on have since been adopted by the main parties.

International relations
In the European Parliament, the party has generally been part of the Non-Inscrits. In 2007, the party was however part of the short-lived European Parliament group Identity, Tradition and Sovereignty alongside parties such as the French National Front. The party has also had some contacts with the Freedom Party of Austria, the Italian Northern League, the Dutch Forum for Democracy, the Danish People's Party, the Slovak National Party, the now-defunct German Freedom Party, and the Sweden Democrats.

In 2007, the party hosted the second international counter-jihad conference in the European and Flemish Parliaments in Brussels together with Edward "Ned" May of the blog Gates of Vienna, which brought together many counter-jihad ideologues and activists including Bat Ye'or, Pamela Geller, Robert B. Spencer, Gerard Batten, Hans Jansen, Andrew G. Bostom and Lars Hedegaard.

In the ninth European Parliament, the party sits with France's National Rally, Italy's Lega Nord, the Dutch Forum for Democracy, the Freedom Party of Austria, Alternative for Germany, the Finns Party and the Conservative People's Party of Estonia in the Identity and Democracy parliamentary group.

Outside the EU, it has ties to the Israeli Likud, the Swiss People's Party, South Africa's Freedom Front Plus, the US Republican Party, and United Russia.

Party chairmen
2004−2008: Frank Vanhecke
2008−2012: Bruno Valkeniers
2012−2014: Gerolf Annemans
2014−present: Tom Van Grieken

Faction leaders
 Party chairman: Tom Van Grieken
 Chamber of Representatives: Barbara Pas
 Senate: Guy D'haeseleer
 Flemish Parliament: Chris Janssens
 European Parliament: Gerolf Annemans
 Brussels Parliament: Dominiek Lootens-Stael

Electoral results
Note that the results also include those of the former Vlaams Blok.

Chamber of Representatives

Senate

Regional

Brussels Parliament

Flemish Parliament

European Parliament

Representation

European politics
VB holds three seats in the ninth European Parliament (2019–2024) for the Dutch-speaking electoral college.

Federal politics

Flemish Parliament

Parliament of the Brussels-Capital Region

References

Bibliography

External links
 
   
 La face cachee du Vlaams Blok (The Hidden Face of the Vlaams Blok): RTBF documentary about the Vlaams Blok made in 2004

News articles
 BBC News: Blow to Belgium's far right 9 November 2004
 The Telegraph: Flemish party banned as racist by Belgium's high court 10 November 2004.
 TIME: Life On The Front Lines: In Antwerp, the far right is facing off against muslims. Who's winning? Vol.165 No.9 | February 28, 2005.
 Haaretz: Between Haider and a Hard Place  - Wednesday 31 August 2005

Eurosceptic parties in Belgium
Flemish Movement
Flemish political parties in Belgium
Far-right political parties in Belgium
Nationalist parties in Belgium
Anti-Islam political parties in Europe
Political parties established in 2004
Right-wing populism in Belgium
Separatism in Belgium
Secessionist organizations in Europe
Pro-independence parties
2004 establishments in Belgium
Anti-Islam sentiment in Belgium
Right-wing populist parties
Member parties of the Identity and Democracy Party
Conservative parties in Belgium
Republican parties
Republicanism in Belgium
Ethnicity in politics
Right-wing parties in Europe
Counter-jihad